The San Francisco Giants are a Major League Baseball (MLB) franchise based in San Francisco, California. They play in the National League West division. Officially known as the "First-Year Player Draft", the Rule 4 Draft is MLB's primary mechanism for assigning players from high schools, colleges, and other amateur clubs to its franchises. The draft order is determined based on the previous season's standings, with the team possessing the worst record receiving the first pick. In addition, teams which lost free agents in the previous off-season may be awarded compensatory or supplementary picks. Since the establishment of the draft in 1965, the Giants have selected 70 players in the first round.

Of those 70 players, 32 have been pitchers, the most of any position; 23 of these were right-handed, while 9 were left-handed. The Giants have also selected thirteen outfielders, seven shortstops, seven catchers, four third basemen, and three players each at first and second base. One player, 2010 selection Gary Brown, was drafted as a center fielder. The franchise has drafted eight players from colleges or high schools in their home state of California, more than any other.  The Giants have never held the first-overall pick, but they did have the second pick in 1985, with which they drafted Will Clark.

Four of San Francisco's first-round draft picks have won three World Series championships with the team—Matt Cain, Tim Lincecum, Madison Bumgarner, and Buster Posey—all as part of the 2010, 2012 and 2014 championship teams.  Two of the Giants' selections have won the National League Rookie of the Year Award: Gary Matthews (drafted in 1968) won in 1973; and Posey (drafted in 2008) won the award in 2010.  Posey was also named the National League's Most Valuable Player in 2012. Three of the Giants selections have been named the Most Valuable Player of the National League Championship Series; Matthews in 1983 with Philadelphia, Clark in 1989 and Bumgarner in 2014. Bumgarner was also named Most Valuable Player of the 2014 World Series. Lincecum, the Giants' 2006 selection, won the Cy Young Award—awarded annually to the best pitcher in each league—in 2008 and 2009.

San Francisco has made 16 selections in the supplemental round of the draft. They have also received 12 compensatory picks since the first draft in 1965. These additional picks are provided when a team loses a particularly valuable free agent in the previous off-season, or, more recently, if a team fails to sign a draft pick from the previous year. The Giants have failed to sign two of their first-round selections: 1979 pick Rick Luecken; and 1996 pick Matt White. The Giants did not receive any compensation for Luecken, but they did receive the 49th pick in 1997 for failing to sign White.

Key

Picks

Footnotes
Free agents are evaluated by the Elias Sports Bureau and rated "Type A", "Type B", or not compensation-eligible. If a team offers arbitration to a player but that player refuses and subsequently signs with another team, the original team may receive additional draft picks. If a "Type A" free agent leaves in this way his previous team receives a supplemental pick and a compensation pick from the team with which he signs. If a "Type B" free agent leaves in this way his previous team receives only a supplemental pick.
 The Giants gained a compensatory first-round pick in 1979 from the California Angels for losing free agent Jim Barr.
 The Giants lost their first-round pick in 1983 to the Montreal Expos as compensation for signing free agent Joel Youngblood.
 The Giants gained a compensatory first-round pick in 1984 from the Detroit Tigers for losing free agent Darrell Evans.
 The Giants gained a compensatory first-round pick in 1988 from the Cincinnati Reds for losing free agent Eddie Milner.  They lost their original first-round pick to the Cleveland Indians as compensation for signing free agent Brett Butler.
  The Giants gained a supplemental first-round pick in 1988 for losing free agent Chili Davis.
  The Giants gained a compensatory first-round pick in 1990 for losing free agent Ken Oberkfell to the Houston Astros.  They lost their original first-round pick to the Astros as compensation for signing free agent Kevin Bass.
 The Giants gained a compensatory and a supplemental first-round pick in 1990 for losing free agent Craig Lefferts to the San Diego Padres.
 The Giants gained a supplemental first-round pick in 1991 for losing free agent Brett Butler. They lost their original first-round pick to the Toronto Blue Jays as compensation for signing free agent Bud Black.
 The Giants gained a compensatory and a supplemental first-round pick in 1994 for losing free agent Will Clark to the Texas Rangers. They lost their original first-round pick to the Houston Astros as compensation for signing free agent Mark Portugal.
 The Giants gained a supplemental first-round pick in 1997 for failing to sign 1996 first-round pick Matt White.
The Giants gained a compensatory first-round pick in 1998 from the Houston Astros for losing free agent Doug Henry.
 The Giants gained a compensatory and a supplemental first-round pick in 1998 for losing free agent Roberto Hernández to the Tampa Bay Devil Rays.
 The Giants gained a supplemental first-round pick in 1998 for losing free agent Wilson Álvarez.
 The Giants gained a supplemental first-round pick in 1999 for losing free agent José Mesa.
 The Giants gained a compensatory and a supplemental first-round pick in 2001 for losing free agent Ellis Burks to the Cleveland Indians.
 The Giants gained a compensatory and a supplemental first-round pick in 2003 for losing free agent Jeff Kent to the Houston Astros.  They lost their original first-round pick to the Oakland Athletics as compensation for signing free agent Ray Durham.
 The Giants lost their first-round pick in 2004 to the Kansas City Royals as compensation for signing free agent Michael Tucker.
 The Giants lost their first-round pick in 2005 to the Florida Marlins as compensation for signing free agent Armando Benítez.
 The Giants gained a supplemental first-round pick in 2006 for losing free agent Scott Eyre.
 The Giants gained a compensatory and a supplemental first-round pick in 2007 for losing free agent Jason Schmidt to the Los Angeles Dodgers.
 The Giants gained a compensatory and a supplemental first-round pick in 2007 for losing free agent Moisés Alou to the New York Mets.
 The Giants gained a supplemental first-round pick in 2007 for losing free agent Mike Stanton.
 The Giants gained a supplemental first-round pick in 2008 for losing free agent Pedro Feliz.
 The Giants gained a supplemental first-round pick in 2011 for losing free agent Juan Uribe.

References
General references

In-text citations

San Francisco Giants
First round draft picks